Below is a list of medical universities located in Russia.
Crimea federal University
 Altai State Medical University
 Amur State University
 Arkhangelsk State Medical Academy
 Astrakhan State Medical University
 Bashkir State Medical University
 Belgorod State University
 Central State Medical Academy
 Chechen State University
 Chelyabinsk State Medical University
 Chita State Medical Academy
 Chuvash State University
 Medical Academy named after S.I. Georgievsky of Vernadsky CFU
 Dagestan State Medical University
 Far Eastern Federal University
 Ingush State University, Faculty of Medicine
 I.M. Sechenov First Moscow State Medical University
 Irkutsk State Medical University
 Izhevsk State Medical Academy
 Immanuel Kant Baltic Federal University
 Kazan State Medical University
 Khabarovsk State Medical Institute
 Khanty-Mansiysk State Medical Academy
 Kabardino-Balkarian State University, Medical Faculty
 Kemerovo State University
 Kirov Military Medical Academy
 Kirov State Medical Institute
 Krasnoyarsk State Medical University, General Medicine Faculty in English
 Kuban State Medical University
 Kursk State Medical University
 Mari State University
 M.K. Ammosov Sakha (Yakutsk) State University, Faculty of Medicine
 Moscow Medical Stomatology Institute, Medical Faculty
 Moscow State University of Medicine and Dentistry
 Moscow State University named after Mikhail Lomonosov
 North Caucasian State Academy 
 Northern State Medical University
 Nizhny Novgorod State Medical Academy, Faculty of Medicine
 North Ossetian State Medical Academy
 Yaroslav-the-Wise Novgorod State University, Faculty of Medicine
 Novosibirsk State Medical University
 Novosibirsk State University, Vladimir Zelman Institute for Medicine and Psychology
 Omsk State Medical University
 Ogarev Mordovia State University
 Omsk State Medical Academy
 Orenburg State Medical University
 Orel State University, Medical Institute
 Privolzhsky Research Medical University
 Pskov State University
 Penza state medical university
 Peoples' Friendship University of Russia, Faculty of Medicine
 Perm State Medical University
 Petrozavodsk State University, Faculty of Medicine
 Rostov State Medical University
 Russian Medical Academy for Continuous Professional Education
 Russian Education Center - Medical University in Russia
 Russian National Research Medical University named after N.I. Pirogov, (formerly known as Russian State Medical University (RSMU)
 Ryazan State Medical University, Faculty for post graduates in English
 Saint Petersburg State Mechnikov Medical Academy
 Saint Petersburg Medical Academy of Postgraduate Studies
 Saint Petersburg State Pavlov Medical University
 Saint Petersburg State Pediatric Medical University
 Saint Petersburg Medico-Social Institute(SPb MSI) 
 Saint Petersburg State University, Faculty of Medicine
 Samara State Medical University, Medical Institute
 Saratov State Medical University
 Siberian State Medical University
 Smolensk State Medical University
 State Classical Academy (Moscow), Faculty of Medicine
 Stavropol State Medical University
 Tambov State University, Medical Institute (Tambov State Medical University)
 Volgograd State Medical University
 Pyatigorsk Medical and Pharmaceutical Institute
 Voronezh State Medical University
 Tula State University
 Tver State Medical Academy
 Tyumen State Medical University
 Ural State Medical University
 Ulyanovsk State University
 Vladivostok State Medical University
 Voronezh N. N. Burdenko State Medical Academy
 Yakutsk State University
 Yaroslavl State Medical Academy, Medical Faculty

See also
Medical school
List of medical schools
List of Russian physicians and psychologists

References

Russia
 
Medical schools